The History of Australia (1851–1900) refers to the history of the indigenous and colonial peoples of the Australian continent during the 50-year period which preceded the foundation of the Commonwealth of Australia in 1901.

Gold rushes

The discovery of gold, beginning in 1851 first at Bathurst in New South Wales and then in the newly formed colony of Victoria, transformed Australia economically, politically and demographically. The gold rushes occurred hard on the heels of a major worldwide economic depression. As a result, about two per cent of the population of Britain and Ireland immigrated to NSW and Victoria during the 1850s. There were also large numbers of continental Europeans, North Americans and Chinese.

The rushes began in 1851 with the announcement of the discovery of payable gold near Bathurst by Edward Hargraves. In that year New South Wales had about 200,000 people, a third of them within a day's ride of Sydney, the rest scattered along the coast and through the pastoral districts, from the Port Phillip District in the south to Moreton Bay and Ballarat in the north. In 1836 a new colony of South Australia had been established, and its territory separated from New South Wales. The gold rushes of the 1850s brought a huge influx of settlers, although initially the majority of them went to the richest gold fields at Ballarat and Bendigo, in the Port Phillip District, which in 1851 was separated to become the colony of Victoria.

Victoria soon had a larger population than New South Wales, and its capital, Melbourne, outgrew Sydney. But the New South Wales gold fields also attracted a flood of prospectors, and by 1857 the colony had more than 300,000 people. Inland towns like Bathurst, Goulburn, Orange and Young flourished. Gold brought great wealth but also new social tensions. Multiethnic migrants came to New South Wales in large numbers for the first time. Young became the site of an infamous anti-Chinese miner riot in 1861 and the official Riot Act was read to the miners on 14 July—the only official reading in the history of New South Wales. Despite some tension, the influx of migrants also brought fresh ideas from Europe and North America to New South Wales—Norwegians introduced skiing in Australia to the hills above the Snowy Mountains gold rush town of Kiandra around 1861. A famous Australian son was also born to a Norwegian miner in 1867, when the bush balladeer Henry Lawson was born at the Grenfell goldfields.

In 1858 a new gold rush began in the far north, which led in 1859 to the separation of Queensland as a new colony. New South Wales thus attained its present borders, although what is now the Northern Territory remained part of the colony until 1863, when it was handed over to South Australia. The separation and rapid growth of Victoria and Queensland mark the real beginning of New South Wales as a political and economic entity distinct from the other Australian colonies. Rivalry between New South Wales and Victoria was intense throughout the second half of the 19th century, and the two colonies developed in different directions. Once the easy gold ran out by about 1860, Victoria absorbed the surplus labour force from the gold fields in manufacturing, protected by high tariff walls. Victoria became the Australian stronghold of protectionism, liberalism and radicalism. New South Wales, which was less radically affected demographically by the gold rushes, remained more conservative, still dominated politically by the squatter class and its allies in the Sydney business community. New South Wales, as a trading and exporting colony, remained wedded to free trade.

Gold produced sudden wealth for a few, and some of Australia's oldest wealthy families date their fortunes from this period, but also employment and modest prosperity for many more. Within a few years these new settlers outnumbered the convicts and ex-convicts, and they began to demand trial by jury, representative government, a free press and the other symbols of liberty and democracy. Contrary to popular myth, there was little opposition to these demands from the colonial governors or the Colonial Office in London, although there was some from the squatters. New South Wales had already had a partly elected Legislative Council since 1825.

The Eureka Stockade of 1854, an armed protest by miners on the Victorian goldfields, and the debate that followed, served as a significant impetus for democratising reforms. The rebellion came about as a result of opposition to government mining licences. Licence fees had to be paid regardless of whether a digger's claim resulted in any gold and less successful operators found it difficult to pay their licence fees. Official corruption was another concern. In November 1854, thousands of diggers rallied to call for the abolition of the licence fee and the vote for all males. A Reform League was formed, with some of its leaders linked to the Chartist movement in England. On 30 November, a mass burning of licenses took place and protesters marched to the Eureka Diggings and constructed a stockade. Led by Peter Lalor, 500 men swore an oath under a flag featuring the Southern Cross and prepared to defend the stockade. On 3 December, the colonial troops attacked the stockade and a twenty-minute battle ensued in which 22 diggers and 5 soldiers were killed. Thirteen diggers committed for trial were all acquitted and the following year the government granted the demands of the rebels. In the subsequent 1855 elections, Peter Lalor became the first Member of the Legislative Council for the seat of Ballarat.

In 1855 New South Wales, Victoria, South Australia and Tasmania (as Van Diemen's Land was renamed) were granted full responsible government, with bicameral parliaments in which the lower houses were fully elected. The upper houses (Legislative Councils) remained dominated by government appointees and representatives of the squatters, worried that the radical democrats might try to seize their vast sheep-runs. Their fears were partly justified, with the Selection Acts of the 1860s, in particular the Robertson Land Acts of 1861, beginning the slow breakup of the squattocracy in Australia's more settled areas.

The arrival of Old World diseases were a catastrophe for the Aboriginal Australians. Between first European contact and the early years of the 20th century, the Aboriginal population dropped from an estimated 500,000 to about one tenth of that number (50,000). Smallpox, measles and influenza were major killers, many others added their toll; for a people without the thousands of years of genetically evolved resistance to diseases that Europeans had, even chickenpox was deadly.

The Bushrangers

Bushrangers, originally referred to runaway convicts in the early years of the British settlement of Australia who had the survival skills necessary to use the Australian bush as a refuge to hide from the authorities. The term "bushranger" then evolved to refer to those who abandoned social rights and privileges to take up "robbery under arms" as a way of life, using the bush as their base. These bushrangers were roughly analogous to British "highwaymen" and American "Old West outlaws," and their crimes often included robbing small-town banks or coach services.

More than 3,000 bushrangers are believed to have roamed the Australian countryside, beginning with the convict bolters and drawing to a close after Ned Kelly's last stand at Glenrowan.

Bold Jack Donahue is recorded as the last convict bushranger. He was reported in newspapers around 1827 as being responsible for an outbreak of bushranging on the road between Sydney and Windsor. Throughout the 1830s he was regarded as the most notorious bushranger in the colony. Leading a band of escaped convicts, Donahue became central to Australian folklore as the Wild Colonial Boy.

Bushranging was common on the mainland, but Van Diemen's Land (Tasmania) produced the most violent and serious outbreaks of convict bushrangers. Hundreds of convicts were at large in the bush, farms were abandoned and martial law was proclaimed. Indigenous outlaw Musquito defied colonial law and led attacks on settlers

The bushrangers' heyday was the Gold Rush years of the 1850s and 1860s.

There was much bushranging activity in the Lachlan Valley, around Forbes, Yass and Cowra in News South Wales. Frank Gardiner, John Gilbert and Ben Hall led the most notorious gangs of the period. Other active bushrangers included Dan Morgan, based in the Murray River, and Captain Thunderbolt, killed outside Uralla.

The increasing push of settlement, increased police efficiency, improvements in rail transport and communications technology, such as telegraphy, made it increasingly difficult for bushrangers to evade capture.

Among the last bushrangers was the Kelly Gang led by Ned Kelly, who were captured at Glenrowan in 1880, two years after they were outlawed. Kelly was born in Victoria to an Irish convict father, and as a young man he clashed with the Victoria Police. Following an incident at his home in 1878, police parties searched for him in the bush. After he killed three policemen, the colony proclaimed Kelly and his gang wanted outlaws.

A final violent confrontation with police took place at Glenrowan on 28 June 1880. Kelly, dressed in home-made plate metal armour and helmet, was captured and sent to jail. He was hanged for murder at Old Melbourne Gaol in November 1880. His daring and notoriety made him an iconic figure in Australian history, folklore, literature, art and film.

Some bushrangers, most notably Ned Kelly in his Jerilderie Letter, and in his final raid on Glenrowan, explicitly represented themselves as political rebels. Attitudes to Kelly, by far the most well-known bushranger, exemplify the ambivalent views of Aussie regarding bushrangers.

Exploration of the interior

European explorers made their last great, often arduous and sometimes tragic expeditions into the interior of Australia over the period—some with the official sponsorship of the colonial authorities and others commissioned by private investors. By 1850, large areas of the inland were still unknown to Europeans. Trailblazers like Edmund Kennedy and the Prussian naturalist Ludwig Leichhardt, had met tragic ends attempting to fill in the gaps during the 1840s, but explorers remained ambitious to discover new lands for agriculture or answer scientific enquiries. Surveyors also acted as explorers and the colonies sent out expeditions to discover the best routes for lines of communication. The size of expeditions varied considerably from small parties of just two or three to large, well equipped teams led by gentlemen explorers assisted by smiths, carpenters, labourers and Aboriginal guides accompanied by horses, camels or bullocks.

In 1860, the ill-fated Burke and Wills led the first north–south crossing of the continent from Melbourne to the Gulf of Carpentaria. Lacking bushcraft and unwilling to learn from the local Aboriginal people, Burke and Wills died in 1861, having returned from the Gulf to their rendez-vous point at Coopers Creek only to discover the rest of their party had departed the location only a matter of hours previously. Though an impressive feat of navigation, the expedition was an organisational disaster which continues to fascinate the Australian public.

In 1862, John McDouall Stuart succeeded in traversing Central Australia from south to north. His expedition mapped out the route which was later followed by the Australian Overland Telegraph Line.

Uluru and Kata Tjuta were first mapped by Europeans in 1872 during the expeditionary period made possible by the construction of the Australian Overland Telegraph Line. In separate expeditions, Ernest Giles and William Gosse were the first European explorers to this area. While exploring the area in 1872, Giles sighted Kata Tjuta from a location near Kings Canyon and called it Mount Olga, while the following year Gosse observed Uluru and named it Ayers Rock, in honor of the Chief Secretary of South Australia, Sir Henry Ayers. These barren desert lands of Central Australia disappointed the Europeans as unpromising for pastoral expansion, but would later come to be appreciated as emblematic of Australia.

Impact on indigenous population

The steady encroachment of European explorers and pastoralists into the lands of the Aborigines met with a variety of responses, from friendly or curious to fearful or violent reactions. Very often, early European exploratory expeditions only succeeded by means of the assistance rendered by Aboriginal guides or negotiators or by advice from tribes encountered along the expeditionary route. Nevertheless, the arrival of Europeans profoundly disrupted Aboriginal society. According to the historian Geoffrey Blainey, in Australia during the colonial period: "In a thousand isolated places there were occasional shootings and spearings. Even worse, smallpox, measles, influenza and other new diseases swept from one Aboriginal camp to another ... The main conqueror of Aborigines was to be disease and its ally, demoralisation".

Pastoralists often established themselves beyond the frontiers of European settlement and competition for water and land between indigenous people and cattlemen was a source of potential conflict—especially in the arid interior. In later decades Aboriginal men began working as skilled stockmen on outback cattle stations.

Christian missionaries sought to convert Aboriginal people. Prominent Aboriginal activist Noel Pearson (born 1965), who was raised at a Lutheran mission in Cape York, has written that Christian missions throughout Australia's colonial history "provided a haven from the hell of life on the Australian frontier while at the same time facilitating colonisation".

Some Anthropological work was also conducted among the Aborigines during the period. A pioneering and landmark work on indigenous Australia was conducted by Walter Baldwin Spencer and Frank Gillen in their renowned anthropological study The Native Tribes of Central Australia in (1899) earned international renown and provides a valuable 19th-century study of an indigenous Australian society. Around this time, Aboriginal welfare advocate and anthropologist Daisy Bates commenced her work among the Aborigines after reading an allegation in The Times about atrocities against Aboriginals in north-west Australia. Bates came to fear that the Aboriginal race was destined for extinction.

Once Europeans had gained control of Aboriginal territory, the local Aborigines who had not been affected by disease or conflict were generally pushed into reserves or missions. Others settled on the fringes of white settlement or worked as station hands for white farmers. Some either intermarried or bore children with Europeans. European diet, disease and alcohol adversely affected many Aboriginal people. A relative few remained living traditional lives un-affected by Europeans at the close of the 19th century—mainly in the far North and in the Centralian deserts.

Booms, depressions and trade unions

The rapid economic expansion which followed the gold rushes produced a period of prosperity which lasted forty years, culminating in the great Land Boom of the 1880s. Melbourne, in particular, grew rapidly, and briefly became Australia's largest city and for a while the second-largest city in the British Empire, before being overtaken by a population boom in Sydney in the early 1900s: the grand Victorian buildings of both cities are a lasting reminder of the period. The traditional craft of Stonemasons in Melbourne were the first organised workers in the Australian labour movement and in the world to win an eight-hour day in 1856.

Melbourne Trades Hall was opened in 1859 with Trades and Labour Councils and Trades Halls opening in all cities and most regional towns in the following forty years. During the 1880s trade unions developed among shearers, miners, and stevedores (wharf workers), but soon spread to cover almost all blue-collar jobs. Shortages of labour led to high wages for a prosperous skilled working class, whose unions demanded and got an eight-hour day and other benefits unheard of in Europe.

Australia gained a reputation as "the working man's paradise." Some employers tried to undercut the unions by importing Chinese labour. This produced a reaction which led to all the colonies restricting Chinese and other Asian immigration. This was the foundation of the White Australia Policy. The "Australian compact", based around centralised industrial arbitration, a degree of government assistance particularly for primary industries, and White Australia, was to continue for many years before gradually dissolving in the second half of the 20th century.

The Great Boom could not last forever, and in 1891 it gave way to the Great Crash, a decade-long depression which created high unemployment, and ruined many businesses, and the employers responded by driving down wages. The unions responded with a series of strikes, particularly the bitter and prolonged 1890 Australian maritime dispute and the 1891 and 1894 shearers' strikes. The colonial ministries, made up for the most part of liberals whom the unions had long seen as allies, turned sharply against the workers and there were a series of bloody confrontations, particularly in the pastoral areas of Queensland. The unions reacted to these defeats and what they saw as betrayals by liberal politicians by forming their own political parties within their respective colonies, the forerunners of the Australian Labor Party. These parties achieved rapid success: in 1899 Queensland saw the world's first Labor Party parliamentary government, the Dawson Government, which held office for six days.

The industrial struggles of the 1890s produced a new strain of Australian radicalism and nationalism, exemplified in the Sydney-based magazine The Bulletin, under its legendary editor J. F. Archibald. Writers such as A B "Banjo" Paterson, Henry Lawson and (a little later) Vance and Nettie Palmer and Mary Gilmour promoted socialism, republicanism and Australian independence. This newfound Australian consciousness also gave birth to a profound racism, against Chinese, Japanese and Indian immigrants. Attitudes towards indigenous Australians during the period varied from the outright armed hostility seen in earlier times to a paternalistic "smoothing the pillow" policy, designed to "civilise" the last remnants of what was considered a dying race.

Development of Australian democracy

By the mid 19th century, there was a strong desire for representative and responsible government in the colonies of Australia, fed by the democratic spirit of the goldfields evident at the Eureka Stockade and the ideas of the great reform movements sweeping Europe, the United States and the British Empire. The end of convict transportation accelerated reform in the 1840s and 1850s. The Australian Colonies Government Act [1850] was a landmark development which granted representative constitutions to New South Wales, Victoria, South Australia and Tasmania and the colonies enthusiastically set about writing constitutions which produced democratically progressive parliaments—though the constitutions generally maintained the role of the colonial upper houses as representative of social and economic "interests" and all established Constitutional Monarchies with the British monarch as the symbolic head of state.

In 1855, limited self-government was granted by London to New South Wales, Victoria, South Australia and Tasmania. An innovative secret ballot was introduced in Victoria, Tasmania and South Australia in 1856, in which the government supplied voting paper containing the names of candidates and voters could select in private. This system was adopted around the world, becoming known as the "Australian Ballot". 1855 also saw the granting of the right to vote to all male British subjects 21 years or over in South Australia. This right was extended to Victoria in 1857 and New South Wales the following year. The other colonies followed until, in 1896, Tasmania became the last colony to grant universal male suffrage.

Propertied women in the colony of South Australia were granted the vote in local elections (but not parliamentary elections) in 1861. Henrietta Dugdale formed the first Australian women's suffrage society in Melbourne, Victoria in 1884. Women became eligible to vote for the Parliament of South Australia in 1895. This was the first legislation in the world permitting women also to stand for election to political office and, in 1897, Catherine Helen Spence became the first female political candidate for political office, unsuccessfully standing for election as a delegate to the Federal Convention on Australian Federation. Western Australia granted voting rights to women in 1899.

Legally, Indigenous Australian males generally gained the right to vote during this period when Victoria, New South Wales, Tasmania and South Australia gave voting rights to all male British subjects over 21—only Queensland and Western Australia barred Aboriginal people from voting. Thus, Aboriginal men and women voted in some jurisdictions for the first Commonwealth Parliament in 1901. Early federal parliamentary reform and judicial interpretation, however, sought to limit Aboriginal voting in practice—a situation which endured until rights activists began campaigning in the 1940s.

Though the various parliaments of Australia have been constantly evolving, the key foundations for elected parliamentary government have maintained an historical continuity in Australia from the 1850s into the 21st century.

Push for federation

The 1890s depression (the most severe Australia had ever faced) made the inefficiencies of the six colonies seem ever more ridiculous, and, particularly in border areas, a push for an Australian Federation began. Other motives for Federation were the need for a common immigration policy (Queensland was busy importing indentured workers from New Caledonia, known as Kanakas, to work in the sugar industry: both the unions and the other colonies strongly opposed this), and fear of the other European powers, France and Germany, who were expanding into the region. British military leaders such as Horatio Kitchener urged Australia to create a national army and navy: this obviously required a federal government. It was also no coincidence that in the 1890s for the first time the majority of Australians, the children of the gold rush immigrants, were Australian-born.

Amid calls from London for the establishment of an intercolonial Australian army, and with the various colonies independently constructing railway lines, New South Wales Premier Sir Henry Parkes addressed a rural audience in his 1889 Tenterfield Oration, stating that the time had come to form a national executive government:

Parkes' vision called for a convention of Parliamentary representatives from the different colonies, to draft a constitution for the establishment of a national parliament, with two houses to legislate on "all great subjects". Though Parkes would not live to see it, each of these things would be achieved within a decade.

Like many in the Federation movement, Parkes was an Imperial loyalist, and at a Federation Conference banquet in 1890, he spoke of blood-kinship linking the colonies:

Parkes was the initial leader of the federation movement, but the other colonies tended to see it as a plot for New South Wales dominance, and an initial attempt to approve a federal constitution in 1891 failed. In 1890, representatives of the six colonies and New Zealand had met in Melbourne. They passed a resolution calling for the union of the colonies and requested that the colonial legislatures nominate representatives to attend a convention to consider a federal constitution. The following year, the month-long 1891 National Australasian Convention was held in Sydney. With all the future states and New Zealand represented, and three committees formed: Constitution, Finance and Judiciary. A draft Constitutional Bill was produced by the Constitution Committee of Samuel Griffith, Inglis Clark and Charles Kingston, aided by Edmund Barton. The delegates returned to their respective colonial parliaments with the Bill, but progress was slow, as Australia faced its 1890s economic Depression.

The cause was, however, taken up the Australian Natives' Association and younger politicians such as Alfred Deakin and Edmund Barton. Following a federalist convention in Corowa in 1893 and an 1895 Premiers conference, five of the colonies elected representatives for the 1897–8 Australian Constitutional Convention, which was conducted in Adelaide, Sydney and Melbourne over the space of a year, allowing time for consultation with the parliaments and other sources. The Constitution Committee this time appointed Barton, Richard O'Connor and John Downer to draft a Bill and after much debate and consultation, New South Wales, South Australia and Tasmania adopted the Bill to be put to their voters. Queensland and Western Australia later moved to do the same, though New Zealand did not participate in the convention.

In July 1898 the Bill was put to a series of referendums in the colonies, with Victoria, South Australia and Tasmania approving, but New South Wales rejecting the proposal. In 1899, a second referendum put an amended Bill to the voters of the four colonies and Queensland and Bill was endorsed in each case.

In March 1900, delegates were despatched to London, where approval for the Bill was being sought from the Imperial Parliament. The Colonial Secretary, Joseph Chamberlain, objected to the provisions limiting the right of appeal to the Privy Council, but a compromise was reached and the Bill put to the House of Commons. Passed on 5 July 1900 and, soon after, was signed into law by Queen Victoria, who proclaimed in September that the new nation would come into being on the first day of 1901. Lord Hopetoun was despatched from London, tasked with appointing an interim Cabinet to oversee the foundation of the Commonwealth and conduct of the first elections. Thus the separate colonies on the continent were to be united under one federal government.

Cultural development

The arts in Australia developed distinct and popular characteristics during the second half of the 19th century and the period remains in many respects, the foundation of many perceptions of Australia to this day. Christianity continued to play a central role in the culture outlook of the colonists and the Church of England remained the largest denomination.

The origins of distinctly Australian painting is often associated with the Heidelberg School of the 1880s-1890s. Artists such as Arthur Streeton, Frederick McCubbin and Tom Roberts applied themselves to recreating in their art a truer sense of light and colour as seen in Australian landscape. Like the European Impressionists, they painted in the open air. These artists found inspiration in the unique light and colour which characterises the Australian bush. Some see strong connections between the art of the school and the wider Impressionist movement, while others point to earlier traditions of plain air painting elsewhere in Europe. Sayers states that "there remains something excitingly original and indisputably important in the art of the 1880s and 1890s", and that by this time "something which could be described as an Australian tradition began to be recognized".

Key figures in the School were Tom Roberts, Arthur Streeton (1867–1943), Frederick McCubbin and Charles Conder. Their most recognised work involves scenes of pastoral and wild Australia, featuring the vibrant, even harsh colours of Australian summers. The name itself comes from a camp Roberts and Streeton set up at a property near Heidelberg, at the time on the rural outskirts of Melbourne. Some of their paintings received international recognition, and many remain embedded in Australia's popular consciousness both inside and outside the art world.

Among the first Australian artists to gain a reputation overseas were the impressionist John Peter Russell (during the 1880s) and Rupert Bunny, a painter of landscape, allegory and sensual and intimate portraits. Opera singer Nellie Melba (1861–1931) travelled to Europe in 1886 to commence her international career. She became among the best known Australians of the period and later participated in early gramophone recording and radio broadcasting.

Australian composers who published musical works during this period include Alice Charbonnet-Kellermann, W. R. Knox, Hugo Alpen, Thomas Bulch, Hooper Brewster-Jones, John Albert Delany, Paolo Giorza and Augustus Juncker (1855–1942).

The distinctive themes and origins of Australia's bush music can be traced to the songs sung by the convicts who were sent to Australia during the early period of the British colonisation, beginning in 1788. Early Australian ballads sing of the harsh ways of life of the epoch and of such people and events as bushrangers, swagmen, drovers, stockmen and shearers were popular during the 19th century. Convict and bushranger verses often railed against government tyranny. Classic bush songs on such themes include: "The Wild Colonial Boy", "Click Go the Shears", "The Dying Stockman" and "Moreton Bay". For much of its history, Australia's bush music belonged to an oral and folkloric tradition, and was only later published in print in volumes such as Banjo Paterson's Old Bush Songs, in the 1890s. The lyrics of Waltzing Matilda, often regarded as Australia's unofficial National anthem, and a quintessential early Australian country music song were composed by the poet Banjo Paterson in 1895.

Banjo Paterson's other seminal works include the bush ballads The Man From Snowy River and Clancy of the Overflow which remain classics of Australian literature. Together with his contemporary Henry Lawson, Paterson is considered among the most influential Australian writers. Lawson, the son of a Norwegian gold prospector wrote extensively on themes often seen as definitive of an emerging Australian style—of egalitarianism and mateship among the young Australian society—as in such works as Shearers, in which he wrote:

They tramp in mateship side by side -
The Protestant and Roman
They call no biped lord or sir
And touch their hat to no man.

Australian writers introduced the character of the Australian continent to world literature over the period. Early popular works told of a frontier society—writers such as Rolf Boldrewood (Robbery Under Arms), Marcus Clarke (For the Term of His Natural Life) wrote of the bushrangering and convictism of nineteenth-century Australia. Two Sydney journalists, J. F. Archibald and John Haynes, founded The Bulletin magazine: the first edition appeared on 31 January 1880. It was intended to be a journal of political and business commentary, with some literary content. Initially radical, nationalist, democratic and racist, it gained wide influence and became a celebrated entry-point to publication for Australian writers and cartoonists such as Henry Lawson, Banjo Paterson, Miles Franklin, and the illustrator and novelist Norman Lindsay. A celebrated literary debate played out on the pages of the Bulletin about the nature of life in the Australian bush featuring the conflicting views of such as Paterson (called romantic) and Lawson (who saw bush life as exceedingly harsh) and notions of an Australian 'national character' were taking firmer root.

Christianity remained the overwhelmingly dominant religion of the colonists through the period—with the Church of England forming the largest denomination. The churches continued to establish missionary work among Australia's indigenous population. With earlier legal restrictions lifted on the observance of the Catholic religion, the Catholic population—largely Irish in origin—established an extensive school network and hospitals throughout the colonies. In 1857, Australia's first Catholic bishop John Bede Polding founded the first Australian order of nuns—the Sisters of the Good Samaritan—to work in education and social work. The most famous Catholic religious of the period was Saint Mary Mackillop, who co-founded the Sisters of St Joseph of the Sacred Heart in rural South Australia in 1866. Dedicated to the education of the children of the poor, it was the first religious order to be founded by an Australian. Mackillop established schools, orphanages and welfare institutions throughout the colonies. She became the first Australian to be honoured by canonisation as a saint of the Roman Catholic Church in 2010.

South Australia was a haven for religious refugees leaving Europe over this period. German Lutherans established the influential Hermmannsberg Mission in Central Australia in 1870. David Unaipon who was to become a preacher and Australia's first Aboriginal author was born at Point McLeay Mission in South Australia in 1872. The son of Australia's first Aboriginal pastor, he is today honoured on the Australian $50 note.

The major churches established great cathedrals in the colonial capitals through the period—notably the Catholic St Mary's Cathedral, Sydney and St Patrick's Cathedral, Melbourne and the Anglican St Paul's Cathedral, Melbourne considered among the finest examples of ecclesiastical architecture in Australia.'Afghan camaleers' from British India were brought to Australia to help establish outback transportation during the 19th century and Australia's first mosque was built at Marree, South Australia in 1861. Hindus came to the Australian colonies to work on cotton and sugar plantations and as merchants. A small number of Jews had come to Australia as convicts on the First Fleet and continued to come as free settlers throughout the 19th century. Buddhists first arrived in large numbers during the gold rushes—Chinese labourers who travelled to the goldfields of Victoria and New South Wales. There were perhaps 27,000 in Victoria by 1857. However, these numbers had declined significantly by the end of the 19th century as many Chinese returned to their homeland.

The Victorian era saw the construction of many other grand public edifices throughout the colonies—including the Parliament buildings of the newly democratic colonies, art galleries, libraries and theatres. The University of Sydney had been founded in 1850 as Australia's first university, and was followed in 1853 by Melbourne University. The National Gallery of Victoria was founded in 1861, becoming an important repository of world and local art within Australia. The Royal Exhibition Building, a World Heritage Site-listed building in Melbourne, was completed in 1880. The opulent Romanesque shopping arcade Queen Victoria Building, was completed in 1898 on the site of the old Sydney markets and built as a monument to the popular and long-reigning monarch, Queen Victoria. The Victorian era remains a seminal period for the historic architecture of many Australian cities and towns.

Over the period, the foundations of the popularity of many Australian sports took root. Intercolonial cricket in Australia started in 1851 and Sheffield Shield inter-state cricket continues to this day. The 1876–77 season was notable for a match between a combined XI from New South Wales and Victoria and the touring Englishmen at the Melbourne Cricket Ground, which was later recognised as the first Test match. A famous victory on the 1882 tour of England resulted in the placement of a satirical obituary in an English newspaper saying that English cricket had "died", and the body will be cremated and the ashes taken to Australia. The English media then dubbed the next English tour to Australia (1882–83) as the quest to "regain the ashes". The tradition continues with The Ashes series remaining one of the most anticipated events on the international cricketing calendar.

The first reports of a sport like rugby being played in Australia date back to the 1820s when visiting ship crews would play army teams in Sydney. However, it was in 1864, that the first formal club was formed at Sydney University. From this beginning, the first metropolitan competition in Australia developed, formally beginning in 1874. The first inter-colonial match was played in Sydney in 1882 and the first international kicked off in 1899 when an Australian team composed of players from New South Wales and Queensland (a forerunner of the Australian Wallabies) played a first Test series—against a visiting team from the British Isles.

The game of Australian rules football began evolving in Melbourne from inter-school games resembling rugby—the first being played in 1858. Melbourne football, geographically isolated, evolved various rule changes and was codified in 1877 when the Victorian Football Association was formed.

Further reading
 Clark, Victor S. "Australian Economic Problems. I. The Railways," Quarterly Journal of Economics, Vol. 22, No. 3 (May, 1908), pp. 399–451 in JSTOR, history to 1907

See also
 Australia and the American Civil War
 History of Australia (1901–1945)
 List of massacres of Indigenous Australians

References

 
19th century in Australia